Reséndez is a surname. Notable people with the surname include:

Andrés Reséndez, American historian
Édson Reséndez (born 1996), Mexican footballer
Irma Resendez (born 1961), American writer
José Luis Reséndez (born 1978), Mexican actor and model